"Heul doch" (English: "Go ahead and cry") and "Shut Up" are rock songs by German singer LaFee. They were written by Bob Arnz and Gerd Zimmermann. The German version of the song, "Heul doch", appears on Lafee's 2007 second studio album Jetzt erst recht where it is the second track. It was released as the album's first single and reached number 3 in the German singles chart when released in May 2007.

The English-language version of the song, "Shut Up", later appeared on LaFee's third studio album Shut Up. It too was released as the albums' first single in 2008.

"Shut Up"

"Shut Up", an English version of "Heul doch", was released as LaFee's first English single in Europe on 23 May 2008. The music video premiered on 30 May 2008 on The Dome.

Formats and track listing
"Heul doch" CD single
 "Heul doch" (Video Version) - 3:49
 "Mitternacht" (Live @ Echo) - 3:48

"Heul doch" CD maxi single
"Heul doch" (Single Version) - 3:36
"Heul doch" (Acoustic Version) - 3:02
"Du bist schön" - 3:27
"Heul doch" (Instrumental) - 4:01
"Documentary Snippet" (Enhanced Part)
"Fotoshooting Making of" (Enhanced Part)
"Videoshooting Making of" (Enhanced Part)

"Shut Up" CD single
 "Shut Up" - 4:04
 "Shut Up" (Single Version) - 3:36
 "Shut Up" (Instrumental Version) - 4:04

Charts

Notes
1: Chart positions of 2007 are of the German version, "Heul doch"

Year-end charts

References

External links
LaFee's official website

2007 singles
LaFee songs
2007 songs
Songs written by Bob Arnz
EMI Records singles
Songs written by Gerd Zimmermann (songwriter)